A by-election was held for the New South Wales Legislative Assembly electorate of Alexandria on 18 May 1912, following the death of John Dacey.

Results

See also
Electoral results for the district of Alexandria
List of New South Wales state by-elections

Notes

References

1912 elections in Australia
New South Wales state by-elections
1910s in New South Wales
May 1912 events